Manakin Sabot, consisting of the villages of Manakin and Sabot, is an unincorporated community in Goochland County, Virginia, United States. It is located northwest of Richmond in the Piedmont and is part of the Greater Richmond region.

History 
Among the earliest European settlers in the Piedmont were several hundred French Huguenots, Protestant religious refugees who had emigrated via London in 1700 and 1701 on the promise of land from the Crown. While they had expected to be settled near existing settlements of Jamestown or in Lower Norfolk County, officials gave them land in areas 20 miles above the falls of the James River at areas previously occupied by the Native American Monacan people. This tribe spoke a Siouan language, as did other tribes of the uplands. One French settlement in Powhatan County became known as Manakin Town (after the native tribe); two villages in Goochland were Manakin and Sabot.

The colony of Manakin was created by a grant of 10,000 acres of land in Virginia from the English King William III in 1699 to the Marquis Olivier de la Muce, a Huguenot and French aristocrat who had been imprisoned in the Castle of Nantes on the Isle of Re prior to escaping to England some ten years earlier. The land was for a Huguenot settlement to be established on the banks of the James River.

Four debarkations left Southampton for Virginia in the summer of 1699, with a total of more than 500 people. Names of three of the ships are known - "Pierre and Anthony" (Galley of London), "Le Nasseau" and "Mary and Ann". Four Huguenot ministers travelled with the expedition: Reverends James Fontaine, Behjamin de Joux, Louis Latane and Claude Philip de Richebourg. The names of two surgeons are also known: Doctors Chastaine and Paul Micou.

Virginia welcomed the refugees, as many of them were ex-aristocrats and noblemen with education and wealth, which they had brought with them on their emigration from France. The Colony exempted the French Huguenots from taxation for a period of seven years. On arriving in Virginia, they settled and wrested homes and plantations out of the wilderness; they built a church, a school, a hospital, and a smithy.

The first group of Huguenots encountered great hardship, as many were urban people unprepared for the frontier. Leaders of the French Huguenots petitioned the government for more assistance as another ship of refugees landed at the Virginia Colony.  Gradually the pioneers adapted and moved out of the village to their farms in the area. By 1750, the village was defunct. Over the decades, the French and their descendants intermarried with English settlers. Many of their descendants moved west or south with other migrants, including into Kentucky and other areas.

The area was increasingly developed by colonists for plantations, with planters shifting from tobacco to wheat and mixed crops in the eighteenth century as the market changed. Ben Dover Farm, Dover Slave Quarter Complex, Huguenot Memorial Chapel and Monument, Oak Grove, Powell's Tavern, Rochambeau Farm, and Tuckahoe Plantation are significant sites, built mostly from the colonial through the mid-19th century, which are listed on the National Register of Historic Places. Some of these farms and plantations were adapted and operated into the 20th century for agriculture.

Notable residents
Major League Baseball player Justin Verlander was raised in Manakin-Sabot.

References

Unincorporated communities in Goochland County, Virginia